The 2018–19 Ascenso MX season is a two-part competition: Apertura 2018 and Clausura 2019. Ascenso MX is the second-tier football league of Mexico. Apertura began on 20 July 2018, and Clausura began on 4 January 2019.

Changes from the previous season
Nine teams met the requirements to be promoted to the Liga MX for the 2019–2020 season: Atlético San Luis, Juárez, Oaxaca, Sinaloa, Sonora, Tampico Madero, UdeG, Zacatecas, and Zacatepec. Atlante and Celaya lost their right to be promoted from the previous season.

The relegated team of the Clausura 2019 Liga MX season had the option of paying MXN$120 million to remain in Liga MX. Of that amount, MXN$60 million would go to the Ascenso MX team that is not certified to be promoted and MXN$60 million would go to new projects determined by the Liga MX assembly. If the team that had normally relegated to the tier below did then the MXN$120 million remained in Liga MX, the team's right to be the 18th team of Liga MX will be seceded to Liga MX and the MXN$120 million must be paid by the other 17 teams of Liga MX. The vacant position in Liga MX could then be occupied by a certified Ascenso MX team or an external sport project. If the position is not occupied, Liga MX reserves all rights to do as deemed fit with it for the 2019–20 Liga MX season.

Teams in the Liga Premier de México must be certified to be promoted to Ascenso MX. If a promoted team is not certified for Ascenso MX, the relegated Ascenso MX team is required to pay MXN$15 million, of which MXN$5 million are given to the team that is not certified, and MXN$10 million are for development projects of Ascenso MX.

Team squads are limited to 12 players not developed in Mexico. A maximum of nine of those players may be in the match-day squad.

Teams are required to give youth players playing time. For the Apertura 2018 season, teams must accumulate 675 minutes with players born on or after 1997. For the Clausura 2019 season, teams must accumulate 882 minutes with players born in 1998.

The away goals rule is no longer a tiebreaker for the liguilla.

15 clubs will participate in this season:
 Lobos BUAP were relegated from Liga MX, but paid the required MXN$120 million to remain in Liga MX.
 Tapachula won the 2017–18 Promotion Final, but were not certified to be promoted prior to the beginning of the season. They received the payment from Lobos BUAP and remain in Ascenso MX.
 Murciélagos were relegated to the Liga Premier de México.
 Tepatitlán won the Liga Premier de México promotion final, but was not certified to be promoted. The right to promotion was initially seceded to the runner-up, Loros UdeC. Loros UdeC was not certified to compete in the category, therefore, only 15 teams will participate in the Ascenso MX season.
 Tlaxcala lost their spot in Ascenso MX as renovations to the Estadio Tlahuicole were not completed on time.

Stadiums and Locations

Personnel and kits

1. On the back of shirt.
2. On the sleeves.
3. On the shorts.
4. On the socks.

Managerial changes

Apertura 2018
Apertura 2018 was the 47th edition of Ascenso MX. The league season began on 20 July 2018 and ended on 11 November 2018. Cafetaleros de Tapachula defended their inaugural league title.

Regular season

Standings

Positions by round

Results

Regular Season statistics

Scoring 
First goal of the season:  Héctor Arrigo for UAEM against Tapachula (20 July 2018)

Top goalscorers 
Players sorted first by goals scored, then by last name.

Source: Ascenso MX

Top assists 
Players sorted first by assists, then by last name.

Source: Ascenso MX Twitter Profile

Hat-tricks 

(H) – Home ; (A) – Away

Attendance

Per team

Highest and lowest

Source: Ascenso MX

Liguilla (Playoffs)

The eight best teams play two games against each other on a home-and-away basis. The higher seeded teams play on their home field during the second leg. The winner of each match up is determined by aggregate score. In the quarterfinals and semifinals, if the two teams are tied on aggregate the higher seeded team advances. In the final, if the two teams are tied after both legs, the match goes to extra time and, if necessary, a penalty shoot-out.

Quarter-finals
The first legs were played on 14 and 15 November, and the second legs were played on 17 and 18 November 2018.

All times are UTC−6 except for matches in Cancún, Ciudad Juárez, Culiacán, and Hermosillo.

First leg

Second leg

Semi-finals
The first legs were played on 21 and 22 November, and the second legs were played on 24 and 25 November 2018.

First leg

Second leg

Final
The first leg was played on 29 November, and the second leg was played on 2 December 2018.

First leg

Second leg

Clausura 2019
The Clausura 2019 season is the 48th season of Ascenso MX. The season began on 4 January 2019. The defending champions are Atlético San Luis, having won their first title.

Regular season

Standings

Positions by round

Results
Teams play every other team once (either at home or away), with one team resting each round, completing a total of 15 rounds.

Regular Season statistics

Top goalscorers 
Players sorted first by goals scored, then by last name.

Source:Ascenso MX

Top assists 
Players sorted first by assists, then by last name.

Source: Ascenso MX Twitter Profile

Hat-tricks and more 

(H) – Home ; (A) – Away

Attendance

Per team

Highest and lowest

Source: Ascenso MX

Liguilla (Playoffs)

The four best teams of each group play two games against each other on a home-and-away basis. The higher seeded teams play on their home field during the second leg. The winner of each match up is determined by aggregate score. In the quarterfinals and semifinals, if the two teams are tied on aggregate the higher seeded team advances. In the final, if the two teams are tied after both legs, the match goes to extra time and, if necessary, a penalty shoot-out.

Quarter-finals
The first legs were played on 17 and 18 April, and the second legs were played on 20 and 21 April 2019.

All times are UTC−5 except for matches in Culiacán and Hermosillo.

First leg

Second leg

Semi-finals
The first legs were played on 24 April, and the second legs were played on 27 April 2019.

First leg

Second leg

Final
The first leg was played on 2 May, and the second leg was played on 5 May 2019.

First leg

Second leg

Aggregate table
The Aggregate table is the general ranking for the 2018–19 season. This table is a sum of the Apertura and Clausura tournament standings. The aggregate table is used to determine seeding for the "Promotion" Final and for 2019–20 Copa MX qualification.

Relegation table
The relegated team will be the one with the lowest ratio of points to matches played in the following tournaments: Apertura 2016, Clausura 2017, Apertura 2017, Clausura 2018, Apertura 2018, and Clausura 2019. On April 5, 2019, Tampico Madero was relegated to Serie A.

Last update: 14 April 2019
 Rules for relegation: 1) Relegation coefficient; 2) Goal difference; 3) Number of goals scored; 4) Head-to-head results between tied teams; 5) Number of goals scored away; 6) Fair Play points
 R = Relegated
Source: Ascenso MX

See also 
2018–19 Liga MX season
2018–19 Liga MX Femenil season

References

External links
 Official website of Ascenso MX

Ascenso MX seasons
1